Bear Lake is an unincorporated community and census-designated place (CDP) in Kalkaska County in the U.S. state of Michigan.  At the 2010 census, the CDP had a population of 327.  Bear Lake is located within Bear Lake Township.

History
The community of Bear Lake was listed as a newly-organized census-designated place for the 2010 census, meaning it now has officially defined boundaries and population statistics for the first time.  The CDP is organized for statistical purposes only and has no legal status as an incorporated municipality.

Geography

The community is located in the northwest portion of Bear Lake Township in Kalkaska County.  The community's namesake is Bear Lake, and other lakes include the smaller Cub Lake, Mallard Lake, Upper Black Lake, and South Black Lake.  M-72 runs east–west through the southern portion of the CDP and connects to Grayling to the east and Kalkaska to the west.

Demographics

References

Unincorporated communities in Kalkaska County, Michigan
Unincorporated communities in Michigan
Census-designated places in Kalkaska County, Michigan
Census-designated places in Michigan
Traverse City micropolitan area